Kloofsig is a suburb of Centurion in Gauteng Province, South Africa. It is the nearest suburb of Centurion to the Pretoria CBD.

References

Suburbs of Centurion, Gauteng